Durston is an English toponymic surname. The name was first recorded in 1641 in A Somerset Petition of 1641. The name is taken from the village of Durston in Somerset. The most likely interpretation is "deer park".

People
Adrian Durston (born 1975), Welsh rugby union player
Albert Durston (1894–1959), RAF officer, Deputy Chief of the Air Staff
David E. Durston (1921–2010), American screenwriter and film director
Jack Durston (1893–1965), English cricketer
Wes Durston (born 1980), English cricketer

Fictional characters
Colonel George Durston, pseudonym for various ghostwriters of Saalfield Publishing

References

English toponymic surnames